Highland  is a hamlet (and census-designated place) in Ulster County, New York, United States. The population was 6,385 at the 2020 census. It is part of the New York City Combined Statistical area.

Highland is a community in the town of Lloyd, on U.S. Route 9W. Routes 44 and 55 run through it as well. It is the town at the western end of the Mid-Hudson Bridge across from Poughkeepsie.

History
The Brown–Ellis House and Anthony Yelverton House are listed on the National Register of Historic Places.

Geography
The community is on the west bank of the Hudson River.

Highland is located at  (41.718357, -73.963590).

Demographics

2010 census
As of the 2010 census, the population was 5,647. The racial makeup of the town was 84.40% White, 6.94% Black or African American, 0.28% Native American, 3.98% Asian, 0.02% Pacific Islander, 1.84% from other races, and 2.53% from two or more races. Hispanic or Latino of any race were 7.84% of the population.

2020 census
As of the 2020 census, the population was 6,385. The racial makeup of the town was 75.60% White, 7.97% Black or African American, 0.27% Native American, 3.73% Asian, 0.06% Pacific Islander, 5.04% from other races, and 7.33% from two or more races. Hispanic or Latino of any race were 11.54% of the population.

References

External links
Highland Public Library

Census-designated places in New York (state)
Hamlets in New York (state)
Census-designated places in Ulster County, New York
New York (state) populated places on the Hudson River
Hamlets in Ulster County, New York